Alberto Bellini (born 7 June 1987) is an Italian volleyball player, playing in position outside hitter. Since the 2017/2018 season, he has played for Conad Reggio Emilia.

Sporting achievements

National Team 
Junior European Championship:
  2006

References

External links
 VolleyTricolore profile
 LegaVolley profile
 Volleybox profile

1987 births
Living people
Italian men's volleyball players
People from Dolo
Sportspeople from the Metropolitan City of Venice